Alliance for the Republic (AxR) was a Spanish electoral alliance formed to contest the 1989 general election by the Internationalist Socialist Workers' Party (POSI) and Socialist Democratic Alliance (ADS). In 1992, the member parties of AxR, POSI and ADS, joined the Socialist Democracy party (DS) into the Coalition for a New Socialist Party (CNPS).

Member parties
Internationalist Socialist Workers' Party (POSI)
Socialist Democratic Alliance (ADS)

References

Defunct political party alliances in Spain
Communist parties in Spain
1992 disestablishments in Spain
Political parties disestablished in 1992